Faisal Al Enezi (born 11 June 1988) is a Kuwaiti footballer who currently plays for Al-Salmiya as a forward.

References 

1988 births
Living people
Association football defenders
Kuwaiti footballers
Kuwait international footballers
2015 AFC Asian Cup players
Sportspeople from Kuwait City
Al Salmiya SC players
Kuwait Premier League players